Coleophora oriolella is a moth of the family Coleophoridae. It is found in Germany and Poland to the Iberian Peninsula, Sardinia, Sicily and Greece and from France to southern Russia.

The larvae feed on Coronilla, Dorycnium pentaphyllum and Dorycnium pentaphyllum germanicum. They create a seed case. Larvae can be found from autumn to May.

References

oriolella
Moths described in 1849
Moths of Europe